Aphichot Wekarun, born February 12, 1997), or simply known as F, is a Thai professional footballer who plays as an attacking midfielder and winger for Thai League 2 club Ubon United.

References

External links

1997 births
Living people
Aphichot Wekarun
Aphichot Wekarun
Aphichot Wekarun
Aphichot Wekarun
Association football midfielders
Aphichot Wekarun
Aphichot Wekarun
Aphichot Wekarun